The List of railway routes in Mecklenburg-Vorpommern provides a list of all railway routes in Mecklenburg-Vorpommern, northeastern Germany. This includes Intercity-Express, Intercity, Regional-Express and Regionalbahn services. In the route tables, the major stations are shown in bold text. Where intermediate stations are not given, these are replaced by three dots "...".

Intercity services
The following Deutsche Bahn operated Intercity-Express (ICE), EuroCity (EC) and Intercity (IC) services run through Mecklenburg-Vorpommern.

Regional services 
The following Regional-Express and Regionalbahn services run through Mecklenburg-Vorpommern.

Rostock S-Bahn 

The Rostock S-Bahn is the local railway network of the Rostock agglomeration. It has 3 lines, all passing through Rostock Hauptbahnhof. The S-Bahn network reaches as far as Warnemünde in the north, and Güstrow in the south.

See also 
 List of scheduled railway routes in Germany

References

External links 
 kursbuch.bahn.de Timetables for all railway routes in Germany
 DB Regio Railway information Mecklenburg-Vorpommern
 bauarbeiten.bahn.de Timetable changes due to construction works in Mecklenburg-Vorpommern (including map of lines)

Mecklenburg-Vorpommern
Transport in Mecklenburg-Western Pomerania
Mecklenburg-Western Pomerania-related lists
Mecklenburg-Vorpommern